CoRoT-12b is a transiting exoplanet found by the CoRoT space telescope in 2010.

It is a hot Jupiter-sized planet orbiting a G2V star with Te = 5675K, M = 1.078M☉, R = 1.116R☉, and above-solar metallicity. It has an estimated age between 3.2 and 9.4 Gyr.

References

Hot Jupiters
Transiting exoplanets
Exoplanets discovered in 2010
12b